George W. Thompson may refer to:

George W. Thompson (politician) (1806–1888), Virginia politician and lawyer
George W. Thompson (Medal of Honor) (1847–?), American soldier and recipient of the Medal of Honor
George William Thompson (born 1956), American international trade attorney and adjunct professor